Bogdan Mustață  (born 28 July 1990) is a Romanian footballer who plays as a right back. He played in Liga I for Unirea Urziceni.

Club statistics

Statistics accurate as of match played 20 October 2011

References

External links
 
 

1990 births
Footballers from Bucharest
Romanian footballers
Liga I players
Association football defenders
FC Steaua II București players
FC Unirea Urziceni players
Living people
FC Steaua București players
CS Turnu Severin players